Anneline Skårsmoen (born 23 June 1989) is a Norwegian curler. She competed at the 2015 World Women's Curling Championship in Sapporo, Japan. She also took part in the 2013 and 2014 European Curling Championships.

References

External links

1989 births
Living people
Norwegian female curlers